Modesto Mederos López (born 30 March 1942) is a Cuban athlete. He competed in the men's discus throw at the 1968 Summer Olympics.

References

1942 births
Living people
Athletes (track and field) at the 1963 Pan American Games
Athletes (track and field) at the 1968 Summer Olympics
Cuban male discus throwers
Olympic athletes of Cuba
Place of birth missing (living people)
Central American and Caribbean Games medalists in athletics
Pan American Games competitors for Cuba
20th-century Cuban people